Fado Curvo is the second studio album by Portuguese fado singer Mariza, released on 6 May 2003.

Reception

Fado Curvo became Mariza's first album to feature on Billboard's World Albums chart, where it peaked at number 6 in June 2003. The album is a certified quadruple platinum record in Portugal: by December 2004, it had sold 80,000 copies in the country, which awarded the album the double platinum.

Reactions to the album were positive, with critics underlining its experimental nature and the blending of traditional songs with contemporary arrangements and compositions. The great range of emotions expressed in Fado Curvo was noted by critics, that considered it to be a breakaway from one of the old traditions of fado, that is to focus on sadness.

Mike Joyce of The Washington Post said that even listeners not well acquainted with fado would not be indifferent to Mariza's voice, that he qualified as being "a dark, rich, commanding contralto".

Track listing

Musicians 
 Mariza - voice
 Mário Pacheco - guitar
 António Neto - guitar
 Manio Freitas - bass
 Tiago Machado - piano (tracks 5 & 12)
 Carlos Maria Trindade - piano (track 10)
 Fernando Araújo - bass and guitar (track 9)
 Quiné - percussion (tracks 3 & 6)
 Miguel Gonçalves - trumpet and fliscorn (track 10)
 Davide Zaccaria - cello (track 5)

Charts

Weekly charts

Certifications

References 

2003 albums
Mariza albums